"Better Things to Do" is a song written by Tom Shapiro, Chris Waters, and co-written and recorded by Canadian country music artist Terri Clark.  It was released in July 1995 as her debut single and served as the lead single to her self-titled debut album.  It was a Top 10 hit on both the U.S. and Canadian country charts, where it peaked at number 3 on both.

Content
"Better Things to Do" is an up-tempo song about a narrator who realizes that she has "better things to do" than to sit around and cry over her ended relationship. At the same time, her man wants her back, thinking she's lost without him.

Critical reception
Deborah Evans Price, of Billboard magazine reviewed the song favorably, calling it a "good uptempo tune with a solid delivery."

Music video
Terri Clark's first music video was released for the song, directed by Michael Merriman. In the video, Clark is shown playing her guitar out in the desert as her ex is attempting to use a payphone to reach her. Later, she hops into her jeep and drives in circles around him as he pleads for her to come back to him. Eventually she drives off, leaving him in a cloud of dust.

Chart performance
"Better Things to Do" debuted at number 72 on the U.S. Billboard Hot Country Singles & Tracks for the week of July 15, 1995.

Year-end charts

References

1995 debut singles
1995 songs
Terri Clark songs
Songs written by Terri Clark
Songs written by Tom Shapiro
Songs written by Chris Waters
Song recordings produced by Keith Stegall
Mercury Records singles
PolyGram singles
Canadian Country Music Association Single of the Year singles